The whoopie pie, alternatively called a black moon, gob (term indigenous to the Pittsburgh region), black-and-white, bob, or "BFO" for Big Fat Oreo (also recorded as "Devil Dogs" and "Twins" in 1835),  is an American baked product that may be considered either a cookie, pie, sandwich, or cake. It is made of two round mound-shaped pieces of usually chocolate cake, or sometimes pumpkin, gingerbread or other flavored cakes, with a sweet, creamy filling or frosting sandwiched between them.

History
While considered a New England classic and a Pennsylvania Amish tradition, they are increasingly sold throughout the United States.

The whoopie pie is the official state treat of Maine (not to be confused with the official state dessert, which is blueberry pie).

Gob [the term indigenous to the Pittsburgh region] has been trademarked by the Dutch Maid Bakery in Johnstown. The owner, Tim Yost, bought the rights to the name and the process in 1980.

Pieces of the giant whoopie pie were sold and the money was used to send Maine-made whoopie pies to soldiers serving overseas.

The town of Dover-Foxcroft, in Piscataquis County, Maine, has hosted the Maine Whoopie Pie Festival since 2009. In 2014, more than 7,500 people attended the festival. The 2013 festival had eight different whoopie pie vendors in attendance. Bakers from across Maine compete for top whoopie pie in a number of categories.

Origin controversy

Maine, Massachusetts, New Hampshire, Pennsylvania and Virginia all claim to be the birthplace of the whoopie pie. The Pennsylvania Dutch Convention & Visitors Bureau notes that their whoopie pie recipe comes from the area's Amish and Pennsylvania German culture—origins that are unlikely to leave an official paper trail—and has been handed down through generations.  In addition the community is very insular and do not adopt external ideas. Therefore the whoopie pie is possibly an internal invention of the Amish community.  

Labadie's Bakery in Lewiston, Maine has been making the confection since 1925. The now-defunct Berwick Cake Company of Roxbury, Massachusetts was selling "Whoopee Pies" as early as the 1920s, but officially branded the Whoopee Pie in 1928 to great success. Various claims suggest that the whoopie pie originated in Massachusetts and spread both north and south, or that German immigrants in Pennsylvania brought the predecessor of the whoopie pie to communities throughout the northeast. A clue into how the possibly Amish dessert got to be so popular in New England can be found in a 1930s cookbook called Yummy Book by the Durkee Mower Company, the manufacturer of Marshmallow Fluff. In this New England cookbook, a recipe for "Amish Whoopie Pie" was featured using Marshmallow Fluff in the filling.

In 2011, the Maine State Legislature considered naming the whoopie pie the official state pie. The proposal received bipartisan support. L.D. 71, officially known as "An Act to Designate the Whoopie Pie as the State Dessert", read "The whoopie pie, a baked good made of two chocolate cakes with a creamy frosting between them, is the official state dessert". The Maine Legislature eventually decided to declare the whoopie pie the official state treat, and chose blueberry pie (made with wild Maine blueberries) as the official state dessert.

See also

Dorayaki
Macaron
Monaka
Moon pie
Sandwich cookie

References

External links

American desserts
Cookie sandwiches
Snack foods
Symbols of Maine
New England cuisine
Pennsylvania Dutch cuisine